Thabo Mongalo (born 23 September 1984 in Botlokwa, Limpopo) is a South African association football striker who plays for F.C. Makompo.

References

1984 births
Living people
People from Capricorn District Municipality
South African soccer players
SuperSport United F.C. players
Association football forwards
Black Leopards F.C. players
Platinum Stars F.C. players
Sportspeople from Limpopo